Lucas Fasson dos Santos (born 30 May 2001) is a Brazilian professional footballer who plays as a defender for Russian club Lokomotiv Moscow.

Career
In 2020, Spanish La Liga side Barcelona offered to sign Fasson from São Paulo but the transfer never happened due to Barcelona opting not to pay his 40 million euro release clause.

For the 2020 season, he signed for Deportes La Serena in the Chilean top flight.

On 8 June 2022, Fasson signed a four-year contract with Russian Premier League club Lokomotiv Moscow.

Career statistics

References

External links
 
 

2001 births
People from Santo André, São Paulo
Footballers from São Paulo (state)
Brazilian people of Italian descent
Living people
Brazilian footballers
Association football defenders
São Paulo FC players
Deportes La Serena footballers
Club Athletico Paranaense players
FC Lokomotiv Moscow players
Campeonato Brasileiro Série A players
Chilean Primera División players
Campeonato Paranaense players
Russian Premier League players
Brazilian expatriate footballers
Brazilian expatriate sportspeople in Chile
Expatriate footballers in Chile
Brazilian expatriate sportspeople in Russia
Expatriate footballers in Russia